Paulo Manuel Neves Alves (born 25 December 1997), commonly known as Paulinho, is a Portuguese footballer who plays for Leixões as a midfielder.

Football career
From 2015, Paulinho spent three years with Liverpool, as part of the club's Academy; he was included in the senior squad for the first time in January 2017, appearing as an unused substitute in an FA Cup third-round replay tie against Plymouth Argyle.

At the end of the 2017–18 season, having not played a game for Liverpool's first team, he was transferred to Wolves, playing for their Under-23s, including two appearances in the EFL Trophy.

In 2019, he transferred to 1. FK Příbram, making his professional debut on 30 September 2019 in the Czech First League. In January 2020, having failed to add to his solitary appearance, he moved to Campeonato de Portugal side A.D. Sanjoanense.

References

External links

1997 births
People from São João da Madeira
Sportspeople from Aveiro District
Living people
Portuguese footballers
Association football midfielders
A.D. Sanjoanense players
FC Porto players
Padroense F.C. players
Liverpool F.C. players
Wolverhampton Wanderers F.C. players
1. FK Příbram players
F.C. Felgueiras 1932 players
Leixões S.C. players
Campeonato de Portugal (league) players
Czech First League players
Liga Portugal 2 players
Portuguese expatriate footballers
Expatriate footballers in England
Portuguese expatriate sportspeople in England
Expatriate footballers in the Czech Republic
Portuguese expatriate sportspeople in the Czech Republic